Authoritative Discourse or Authoritative Teaching is the third tractate from Codex VI of the Nag Hammadi Library. The writing reflects on the nature of the soul and its relationship with the material world. The soul is a spiritual entity that has come from the heavens. It becomes separated from its spiritual origins and is entrapped in matter when it falls into worldly desires such as lust, gluttony, and ignorance. The text emphasizes the importance of knowledge and the pursuit of spirituality in order to overcome the forces that try to entrap the soul in matter. The Devil tries to deceive the soul with transitory and deceptive pleasures, but the soul that has tasted these things will eventually realize its true nature and turn away from them. The soul will instead look for eternal, spiritual things and seek to know God. The text warns of those who are ignorant and do not seek God, being identified as the children of the Devil.

Summary
The opening describes the creation and nature of the soul. The soul came from the hidden heavens and is not separated from them. A bridegroom aimed to help the soul understand its true identity and renounce matter. The body came from lust and the soul became a brother to lust and other negative emotions. The soul can either choose to follow lust and be excluded or choose knowledge and inherit from its father. Those who choose lust will fall into debauchery and forget their true identity, while those who choose knowledge will inherit with pleasure and honor.

The text describes a world in which matter and material things are considered to be evil, while the soul and spiritual knowledge are good. The Father existed before anything else and brought about the world to reveal his wealth and glory, and to bring about a great contest. Those who follow the Gnostic teachings are to ignore and be victorious over the ignorance of their adversaries and cling to spiritual knowledge, not material things. The soul is said to be ill because it is in a house of poverty, but by constantly seeking spiritual knowledge and applying it as a medicine, it can see and overcome the forces that fight against it.

The writing continues to describe the struggle of the soul against evil. The soul is compared to a fish, and the Devil is depicted as a fisherman who tries to lure the soul with worldly pleasures, such as the desire for material possessions and the love of money. These worldly pleasures are seen as deceptive and transitory, and lead to ignorance and enslavement. The soul learns to reject these false pleasures and instead seeks out the true spiritual food that leads to life and understanding. The soul overcomes shame and scorn in this world and is rewarded with grace and glory.

The text ends by discussing the ignorance of those who do not seek after God and how they behave cruelly towards others. These people are compared unfavorably to pagans, who at least have a sense of a higher power and give charity. However, the senseless man who hears the word of God but does not inquire about it is worse than a pagan. On the other hand, the rational soul who seeks God learns about him and finds rest in him, which brings everlasting glory and power.

References

Gnostic apocrypha
3rd-century works
Nag Hammadi library